Zion Nybeck (born 12 May 2002) is a Swedish professional ice hockey winger currently playing for AIK of the HockeyAllsvenskan (Allsv). Nybeck was drafted in the fourth round, 115th overall, by the Carolina Hurricanes in the 2020 NHL Entry Draft.

Playing career
Nybeck made his Swedish Hockey League (SHL) debut with HV71 during the 2019–20 season.

After helping HV71 return to the SHL after one season in the HockeyAllsvenskan in 2021–22, Nybeck left HV71 to remain in the Allsvenskan in signing a one-year contract with AIK on 9 May 2022.

Career statistics

Regular season and playoffs

International

References

External links
 

2002 births
Living people
AIK IF players
Almtuna IS players
Carolina Hurricanes draft picks
HV71 players
People from Alvesta Municipality
Swedish ice hockey forwards
Sportspeople from Kronoberg County